Johannes Petrus van Heerden (born 9 December 1986) is a Romanian rugby union player of South African background. He plays as lock, and occasionally flanker.

He plays for SuperLiga club Baia Mare and București based European Challenge Cup side the Wolves. Van Heerden also plays for Romania's national team the Oaks.

References

External links

 
 
 
 
 

1986 births
Living people
Romanian rugby union players
Romania international rugby union players
South African rugby union players
București Wolves players
CSM Știința Baia Mare players
USA Perpignan players
Rugby union locks
Rugby union flankers
South African emigrants to Romania
Rugby union players from Pretoria